Songs for Clem is an album by Canadian singer-songwriter by Sarah Harmer, credited to Harmer and Jason Euringer, and released in 1999.

History
The album was never intended by Harmer for widespread release, but as a 1998 Christmas gift for her father, Clem Harmer. It features Harmer's personal, home-recorded renditions of several of her father's favourite pop and country standards. Upon hearing the recording, Harmer's friends and family convinced her to release it independently. She did so in 1999; following her commercial breakthrough in 2000 with You Were Here, the album was re-released under Harmer's new major label distribution deal with Universal Music Canada.

Clem Harmer subsequently appeared on Sarah's 2005 album I'm A Mountain, contributing backing vocals to two songs.

Reception

Allmusic music critic Johnny Lofthus wrote the album feels "lovingly handmade, with cover art right out of a child's Father's Day art project and an immediate, field-type recording quality that features accompaniment from crickets and a passing rainstorm. This isn't to say it's lo-fi; on the contrary, it's crystal clear." and that "... it's a true sentimental journey for people inspired by their parents to love music."

Track listing
"Blue Moon of Kentucky"  (Bill Monroe) – 2:07
"Tennessee Waltz"  (Redd Stewart, Pee Wee King) – 2:52
"Black Coffee"  (Sonny Burke, Paul Francis Webster) – 2:53
"Stormy Weather"  (Harold Arlen, Ted Koehler) – 3:00
"Oh Bury Me Not"  (Traditional) – 1:25
"Just a Closer Walk With Thee"  (Traditional) – 3:22
"Shine on Harvest Moon"  (Jack Norworth, Nora Bayes) – 2:13
"Trouble in the Fields"  (Nanci Griffith, Rick West) – 4:02
"Your Cheatin' Heart"  (Hank Williams) – 2:32
"Summertime"  (George Gershwin, DuBose Heyward, Ira Gershwin) – 3:45
"Sentimental Journey"  (Les Brown, Ben Homer, Bud Green) – 2:44
"O, My Beloved Father"  (Giacomo Puccini, Giovacchino Forzano) – 2:07

Personnel
Sarah Harmer – vocals, guitar, piano, harmonica
Jason Euringer – bass, guitar, background vocals, slides
Spencer Evans – clarinet, piano, background vocals
Benji Perosin – trumpet

Production
Produced by Sarah Harmer
Mastered by Jan Turney and Graeme McCann
Engineered and mixed by Robin Aube, assisted by Tom Lawless
Photography by Kelsey Finlayson

References

1999 albums
Sarah Harmer albums